"Come on You Reds" is a song recorded by the 1994 Manchester United football squad, written and produced by the rock group Status Quo. It first entered the UK Singles Chart on 30 April 1994 and remained there for a total of 15 weeks, reaching a two-week peak of number one. The song is the only (as of 2018) club side football single to reach number one on the UK chart; however, "Back Home" (in 1970) and "World in Motion" (in 1990) both topped the charts for the England national side. The song also reached number one in Denmark and became a top-10 hit in Ireland and Norway.

History
With Status Quo involved in the recording of the track, it was decided that the band's 1988 single "Burning Bridges" would form the basis of the song, with altered lyrics to suit the Manchester United theme. The single was released on 18 April 1994, four weeks before the 1994 FA Cup Final. By the weekend of the game, the song had reached number one, where it remained for two weeks. It then dropped down the chart, remaining there for a total of 15 weeks. Opponents Chelsea also released a team song, "No One Can Stop Us Now", which reached number 23.

Charts

Weekly charts

Year-end charts

Certifications

References

1994 singles
1994 songs
Manchester United F.C. songs
Number-one singles in Denmark
Status Quo (band) songs
UK Singles Chart number-one singles